The Central African Backbone (CAB) is a fiber-optic Internet backbone connecting the countries of the Economic Community of Central African States (ECCAS) in Africa via high speed internet. The countries included in the CAB project are: Cameroon, the Central African Republic, Chad, Democratic Republic of the Congo, Gabon, Republic of the Congo and São Tomé and Príncipe. It's split up into five phases, each phase focusing on the fibre rollout in one or more countries.

List of CAB phases

Funding
The project is funded by a loan from the World Bank, initially estimated at $160 million USD. As of 2015, total World Bank funding for the project is at $206 million USD, and the total project cost, including financing from other sources than the World Bank, is estimated at $273 million USD.

CAB in Cameroon
In Cameroon the CAB runs from the coast, through the capital of Yaoundé, to the north east where it meets up with the Chadian part of the backbone.

CAB in Central African Republic
The deployment of the CAB in the Central African Republic was slowed down by the political instability in 2012-2013. It runs from Chad in the north to the capital of Bangui.

CAB in Chad
In Chad the CAB runs from N'Djamena towards the south where it forks off in two directions, one towards Cameroon and one towards the Central African Republic.

CAB in Democratic Republic of the Congo
In Democratic Republic of the Congo the CAB will run from Kinshasa to Lubumbashi and Kisangani.

CAB in Gabon
In Gabon the CAB runs from Libreville to Franceville, and from thereon it splits in two directions, one towards Lékoni and another towards Koulamoutou.

CAB in Republic of the Congo
In Republic of the Congo the CAB runs from the port city of Pointe-Noire to Brazzaville, and from thereon north to Ouesso.

CAB in São Tomé and Príncipe
In São Tomé and Príncipe the CAB runs in the capital of São Tomé

International terrestrial fibre interconnection
The CAB crosses several international borders, including a Cameroon-Chad interconnection, a Chad-CAR interconnection, a Congo-DRC interconnection between Brazzaville and Kinshasa, as well as a Congo-Gabon interconnection between running from Dolisie along the Congo–Ocean Railway, and through Mont-Mbelo, Makabana, Mossendjo and Mbinda, before crossing over into Gabon.

See also
List of terrestrial fibre optic cable projects in Africa

References

Economic Community of Central African States
Internet in Africa
Proposed telecommunications infrastructure
Proposed infrastructure in Africa
Optical telecommunications cables